Opportunity is an unincorporated community in Deer Lodge County, Montana, United States. It is located on Pintler Veterans Memorial Scenic Highway, 6 miles from Anaconda. It is near the Anaconda Smelter Stack.

Notes

Unincorporated communities in Deer Lodge County, Montana
Unincorporated communities in Montana